Pan Africa Christian (PAC) University  is a private Christian University in Nairobi, Kenya.

History 
The first classes were held in September 1978, in what was then known as Pan Africa Christian College.

Originally founded as a Bible College, the university was built on the site of the former Lumumba Institute (Current Thika Road Campus).

With the changes in the Higher Education sector in Kenya, the college grew to a point where it was Chartered as a Private University by President Mwai Kibaki in February 2008.  With the Charter came the change in name to Pan Africa Christian (PAC) University.

Over the years, PAC University has grown in terms of its academic-offering to a point where it currently has over thirty five (35) courses on offer, with all the graduate and undergraduate courses approved by Commission for University Education (CUE).{

Academics 
1. SCHOOL OF THEOLOGY

Department of Biblical & Theological Studies:
MA in Theology
MA in Pentecostal & Charismatic Studies
Master of Divinity
Master of Children and Youth Ministry
BA in Bible & Theology
Bachelor of Bible Translation

Department of Transformational Church & Youth Leadership

BA in Transformational Church Leadership
Diploma in Transformational Church Leadership
Diploma in Pastoral Care & Counselling
Diploma in Youth Ministry
Certificate in Transformational Church Leadership
Certificate in Youth Development Program

2. SCHOOL OF LEADERSHIP, BUSINESS & TECHNOLOGY

Department of Leadership
PhD in Organizational Leadership
Master of Arts in Leadership
Post Graduate Diploma in Leadership
Diploma in Leadership & Management
Certificate in Leadership & Management
Department of Business Studies
Master of Business Administration
Bachelor of Commerce
Bachelor of Business Leadership
Diploma in Entrepreneurship Development
Diploma in Purchasing & Supplies Management
KASNEB Packages (ATC & CPA)
Certificate in Purchasing & Supplies Management
Certificate in Entrepreneurship Development
Computing and IT Department
Bachelor of Business Information Technology
Diploma in Information Communication Technology
Certificate in Information Communication Technology
Certificate in Computer Packages
International Computer Driving License (ICDL)

3. SCHOOL OF HUMANITIES & SOCIAL SCIENCES

Department of Psychology
PhD in Marital and Family Therapy
Master of Arts in Marriage and Family Therapy
Bachelor of Arts in Counselling Psychology
Diploma in Counselling
Certificate in Counselling

Department of Communication, Languages & Lingusistics

Bachelor of Arts in Communication
Diploma in Communication
Diploma in Chinese Language
Certificate in Communication (Journalism, Public Relations and Publishing)
Certificate in Situational Chinese

Department of Community Development
Masters of Arts in Community Development and Social Protection 
Bachelor of Arts in Community Development
Diploma in Community Development
Certificate in Community Development

Intakes 
The three major intakes are January, May, and September.

Learning Modes 
Students can choose to study in the following modes:
1. Online
2. Daytime classes
3. Evening classes
4. Weekend classes
5. Holiday-based classes

References

External links
http://www.cue.or.ke/index.php/accredited-universities

Private universities and colleges in Kenya
Education in Nairobi
Christian education in Kenya
Educational institutions established in 1978
1978 establishments in Kenya
Evangelical universities and colleges
Religious organisations based in Kenya